Thomas Francis Cronan (April 24, 1885 – December 16, 1962) was an American athlete who competed mainly in the triple jump.

He competed for the United States in the 1906 Intercalated Games held in Athens, Greece in the triple jump where he won the bronze medal.

References 
 

1885 births
1962 deaths
American male triple jumpers
Olympic bronze medalists for the United States in track and field
Medalists at the 1906 Intercalated Games
Athletes (track and field) at the 1906 Intercalated Games